Aceval may refer to:

Aceval (surname)
Benjamín Aceval, a town in Paraguay
ACEVAL/AIMVAL, joint US Air Force and Navy test program